Gillian Elizabeth Aitken, CB (née Parker; born 1960) is a British lawyer, civil servant and university administrator. Since 2018, she has been Registrar of the University of Oxford.

Career

Education and early career 
Born in 1960, Aitken graduated from St Hugh's College, Oxford, in 1982. She worked for McKenna &Co from 1986 to 1993 and was admitted a solicitor in December 1988. She left the private sector to join the Government Legal Service in 1993.

Senior civil servant 
Aitken worked in the Department of Health (where she worked on NHS Foundation Trusts) until 2004, when she was appointed Director of Legal Services at the Department for Environment, Food and Rural Affairs (DEFRA). In March 2007, she was appointed Solicitor and Director-General for Legal Services in DEFRA, succeeding Donald Macrae. In 2009 she became the department's Director-General for Law and Corporate Services. In March 2010, she moved to the Department for Work and Pensions to be Director-General, Legal, a role which was reorganised in October 2011 as Director-General, Professional Services. In February 2014, she was appointed General Counsel and Solicitor to HM Revenue and Customs (HMRC), and remained in the role until July 2018.

At HMRC, Aitken headed a team of 180 lawyers and 350 employees which was noted in The Lawyer for having an 80% success rate at trial and adding £20bn to the government's tax income in 2014; it reported that she was responsible for "implementing accurate risk-predictions for ministers, which allow in-house lawyers to use precedent as a type of barometer to determine the percentage outcome of specific claims."

University administrator 
Aitken left HMRC when she was appointed Registrar of the University of Oxford, and in the capacity is "head of the central administrative services", with responsibility for the University’s administrative services and governance. She was also elected to a fellowship at St Hugh's College, Oxford.

Honours and awards 
In the 2019 New Year Honours, Aitken was appointed a Companion of the Order of the Bath (CB), "for services to taxpayers and to social mobility".

References 

Living people
1960 births
English solicitors
British civil servants
English women lawyers
Women civil servants
Registrars of the University of Oxford
Alumni of St Hugh's College, Oxford
Fellows of St Hugh's College, Oxford
Companions of the Order of the Bath